Charles Omar Nyanor (1 September 193530 April 2004) was an economist, a political scientist, a banker, a lawyer, an industrialist and a Ghanaian politician who represented the Upper Denkyira constituency. He was a member of the 1st Parliament of the 2nd Republic of Ghana.

Early life and education 
Charles Omar Nyanor was born on 1 September 1935. He is from Dunkwa-on-Offin. He attended University College, London and Lincoln's Inn, London, where he attained a Bachelor of Science degree in economics in 1964. He also became an Associate of the Institute of Bankers (AIB), London in 1965. He became a Barrister-at-Law in 1966.

Politics 
He returned to Ghana in 1967, and worked as the Senior Project Officer in the Project Appraisal and Implementation and legal work associated with project implementation at the National Investment Bank. C.O. as affectionately called by his colleagues served as the deputy minister, Ministry of Finance and Economic Planning under the government of Dr. K.A. Busia from 1969 to 1972 (Progress Party). In the ministry of finance he was instrumental in the establishment of the Merchant Bank, the small business promotion scheme and the bank for housing and construction.  
He was later elected  into the Parliament of Ghana in 1996, as a member of the New Patriotic Party. 
Mr. Nyanor also served as minister of private sector development under President J.A. Kuffour and subsequently as minister of state in charge of Divestiture implementation committee. 
During his lifetime, the late uncle, Nana Kwaku Ofori II, Dunkwahene, proposed C.O. Nyanor to succeed him after his reign. But his love for politics will not permit him. He offered the excuse as one of the main reasons why he refused acceding to the Dunkwa-hene throne.

He was also a member of the Third Parliament of the Fourth Republic of Ghana. He was elected during the 2000 Ghanaian General Elections where he polled 25,994 of votes cast which represents 63.90 of the total votes cast over his opponents; Kwaku Oduro-Bonsu of the National Democratic Congress who polled 13,335 votes representing 32.80% of the total votes cast, Beatrice Buadu of the Convention Peoples Party who obtained 891 votes representing 2.20% of the total votes cast, Apeko-Kow Anderson of the National Reform Party who also polled 289 representing 0.70% of the total votes cast and Kwasi Antoban Joseph of the United Ghana Movement polling 167 votes which represent 0.40% of the total votes cast for the  Upper Denkyira constituency.

Occupation 
He worked as the Senior Investment development officer of the National Investment Bank, Accra. Private Legal Practitioner, chairman of the board of directors SPPC, Bibiani Metal Works (Shareholder and active partner), Kowus Motors,  State Owned Institutions and other Privately held companies

Personal life 
He was a devout Methodist. Nyanor was married with children.

Death 
Nyanor, died at age 69 after battling a short illness.

References

Nyanor to be buried on June 26
Ghana: Vacant Seat in Parliament
MPs mourn Nyanor
Government's policy on works and housing lacks focus

1935 births
2004 deaths
Ghanaian MPs 1969–1972
20th-century Ghanaian lawyers
Ghanaian bankers
Ghanaian economists
New Patriotic Party politicians
Government ministers of Ghana
People from Central Region (Ghana)
Ghanaian Christians
Alumni of University College London
Lincoln's Inn
Ghanaian MPs 2001–2005